Gao Weidong (born November 1972) is a Chinese business executive and politician who served as chairman of the Board of Moutai from 2020 to 2021. As of May 2022 he was under investigation by China's top anti-corruption agency. He is a delegate to the 13th National People's Congress.

Biography
Gao was born in Dengzhou, Henan, in November 1972. In 1990, he entered Guizhou Institute of Technology (now Guizhou University), majoring in industrial and civilian buildings. After graduating in 1993, he was despatched to Guiyang Economic and Technological Development Zone as an official in the Environmental Protection Bureau. He joined the Chinese Communist Party (CCP) in December 1997. He was appointed deputy governor of Xiaohe District in October 2000, concurrently serving as deputy director of the Management Committee of Guiyang Economic and Technological Development Zone. 

He was party secretary and chairman of Jinyang New Area Development and Construction Co., Ltd. in September 2006 and Jinyang Construction Investment (Group) Co., Ltd. in March 2009. 

He became director of Guiyang Transportation Bureau in January 2010, but having held the position for only two years. He was promoted to vice mayor of Guiyang in February 2012, concurrently serving as deputy director and then director of Gui'an New Area Management Committee. In February 2017, he became the deputy director of Guizhou Provincial Transportation Department, rising to director the next year. In March 2020, he was made chairman of the Board of Moutai, a position he held for a year and a half. In August 2021, he took office as director of Guizhou Coalfield Geology Bureau.

Downfall
On 13 May 2022, he was put under investigation for alleged "serious violations of discipline and laws" by the Central Commission for Discipline Inspection (CCDI), the party's internal disciplinary body, and the National Supervisory Commission, the highest anti-corruption agency of China. Yuan Renguo, another former chairman of the Board of Moutai, was also sacked for graft.

References

1972 births
Living people
People from Dengzhou
Guizhou University alumni
People's Republic of China politicians from Henan
Chinese Communist Party politicians from Henan
Delegates to the 13th National People's Congress